Taxes in Poland are levied by both the central and local governments. Tax revenue in Poland is 33.9% of the country's GDP in 2017. The most important revenue sources include the income tax, Social Security, corporate tax and the value added tax, which are all applied on the national level.

Income earned is generally subject to a progressive income tax, which applies to all who are in the workforce. For the year 2014, two different tax rates on income apply

Value added tax (VAT) 
In 1993, Poland implemented its Value Added Tax system. Polish VAT is overseen by VAT acts and the Fiscal Penal Code, and is enforced by the Ministry of Finance.

Value-Added Tax applies to most trade in goods in Poland. 23% is the basic rate. Lower rates of 8% and 5% also apply for foodstuffs.  Furthermore, some services are taxed at 0% tax rate or exempted from value-added tax (eg. financial and postal services).

Income tax scale before 2017

Income tax scale in 2017
In 2017, tax rates were changed.  Now, the tax is calculated using two tables. The first table does determine the amount of tax.

The second table is used to determine the tax-reducing amount from the tax.

Income tax scale in 2018
In 2018, the tax scale was again changed. Income tax was calculated as follows:

The second table is used to determine the tax-reducing amount from the tax.

Income tax scale in 2019
In 2019, the tax scale was again changed. Income tax in 2019 is calculated as follows:

The second table is used to determine the tax-reducing amount from the tax.

Income tax scale in 2020
In 2020, the tax scale was changed again. Income tax in 2020 is calculated as follows:

The second table is used to determine the tax-reducing amount from the tax in 2020.

Income tax scale in 2022 
in 2022, there were significant changes in the tax-free amount and in taxes.

The tax-free amount has been increased to 30,000 PLN year (6,600 Euro per year), for every income and is deducted from salary every month

There is also a non-deducted health care rate for each income of 9% and a reduction for the flat tax (for the self-employed) of 4.9%. This makes everyone pay the fee even if their income is in the free amount.

Income tax scale in 2023 

In 2023 tax-free amount remains at level of 30,000 PLN year for every income and is deducted from salary every month

Social security contributions in 2014
Furthermore, a range of social security contributions apply to all in the workforce, and are shared by the employee and the employer. These insurance contributions are paid by both private and public employees until a given ceiling. For the year 2014, the rates in the following table apply

Overall worker tax rate and mandatory insurance amount to 53%.

Social security contributions in 2023
The cap of salaries in 2023, for which rates below apply, is PLN 208,050.

See also
 Economy of Poland

References